The 1994 Skoda Grand Prix was a professional ranking snooker tournament that took place at the Assembly Rooms in Derby, England. The event started on 10 October 1994 and the televised stages were shown on BBC between 16 and 23 October 1994.

John Higgins won in the final 9–6 against Dave Harold to claim his first ranking title. Higgins, ranked 51 at the time, defeated four top 16 seeded players at the event: Willie Thorne (15) in the first round; James Wattana (4) in the last 16; Ronnie O'Sullivan (10) in a 5–0 whitewash in the quarter finals and Joe Swail (12) in the semi finals.

Prize fund and ranking points
The breakdown of prize money and ranking points of the event are shown below:

Main draw

Final

References

1994
Grand Prix
Grand Prix (snooker)
Grand Prix